Sadlers Creek State Park is a state park located near the town of Anderson in Anderson County, South Carolina. The park is on a peninsula which extends into Lake Hartwell.

Activities available at the park include picnicking, fishing, hiking, boating, swimming, biking, bird watching and geocaching.

Amenities include picnic shelters, a boat ramp, two playgrounds, a 5.4 mile long loop bike trail and a lakeside Pavilion available for large gatherings.

References

External links
Official Website

State parks of South Carolina
Protected areas of Anderson County, South Carolina